The 1958 NBA All Star Game was the eighth NBA All-Star Game.

Roster

Eastern Conference
Head Coach: Red Auerbach, Boston Celtics

Western Conference
Head Coach: Alex Hannum, St. Louis Hawks

References

National Basketball Association All-Star Game
All-Star Game
Sports competitions in St. Louis
January 1958 sports events in the United States
1950s in St. Louis
1958 in sports in Missouri